Pseudo-Tertullian is the scholarly name for the unknown author of Adversus Omnes Haereses, an appendix to the work De praescriptionem haereticorum of Tertullian. It lists 32 heresies, and there is consensus that this work is not by Tertullian himself.

A traditional theory is that the work is a Latin translation of a Greek original, a lost work Syntagma written by Hippolytus, c. 220. Recent scholarship, agreeing with a theory of Richard Adelbert Lipsius, suggests that this work Syntagma was the common source for Philastrius and the Panarion of Epiphanius, also.

The name "Pseudo-Tertullian" is also applied to the author of a poem written against Marcion. The Catholic Encyclopedia describes it as "doggerel hexameters", and mentions two theories: that the poem was written by Commodian; and that Adversus Omnes Haereses was written by Victorinus of Pettau.

Notes

External links
tertullian.org on Spurious Works

Church Fathers